The Água Quente River is a river on the borders of Maranhão and Piauí states in northeastern Brazil.

See also
List of rivers of Maranhão

References
Brazilian Ministry of Transport

Rivers of Maranhão
Rivers of Piauí